The Antonov A-15 is a Soviet mid-wing, V-tailed single-seat, FAI Open Class glider that was designed by Oleg Antonov and produced by Antonov.

Design and development
The A-15 was a follow-on design, based on the bureau's experience gained with the A-11 and A-13 gliders. This new open class design quickly proved its worth as a record-setter.

The aircraft is made from aluminium. Unusually for a Cold War Soviet aircraft, its  span wing employs an American NACA 64-618 airfoil at the wing root, transitioning to an NACA 64-616 section at the wingtip. The A-15 carries  of water ballast. The landing gear is a retractable monowheel.

A total of 350 A-15s were built.

Operational history

In August 2011, there was one A-15 registered with the Federal Aviation Administration in the United States.

Specifications (Antonov A-15)

See also

Notes

References

External links

A-15 Three view
Photo of the A-15
Video of A-15 landing

1960s Soviet sailplanes
A-15
Glider aircraft
Aircraft first flown in 1960
V-tail aircraft